John D. McKean is a fireboat that served the New York City Fire Department as Marine Company 1. She is named after John D. Mckean, who died in a 1953 steam explosion while trying to save a predecessor fireboat, the George B. McClellan.

Operational history

John D. McKean cost $1.4 million. She fought a notable fire at the Staten Island Ferry Terminal, in 1991. It was one of the fire boats, along with Fire Fighter and the retired John J. Harvey, that responded to Manhattan during the September 11th attacks to supply firefighters with water after water mains broke following the collapses. The boat helped rescue passengers from US Airways Flight 1549, when she made an emergency landing on the Hudson River in 2009.

Museum vessel

In 2010, John D. McKean was retired and put in reserve status, after being replaced by a new vessel, the Three Forty Three, named for the FDNY members who lost their lives in the line of duty on September 11, 2001.

On March 2, 2016, FDNY sold the John D. McKean at auction for $57,400.
The vessel was purchased by Edward Taylor and Michael Kaphan, partners in several restaurants. The fireboat was turned over to the Fireboat preservation project which is a non for profit 501(c)., The preservation project plans to turn the boat into a floating museum.

In the summer of 2019 the vessel underwent repairs to her hull that required her to be hauled out of the water.

As of 2022 plans were that John D. McKean would moored at Pier 25 in Manhattan, and it was expected to open in spring 2022.

It has not yet opened as a museum.

Namesake
The vessel was named after a FDNY sailor, an engineer on the fireboat George B. McClellan. He died when he stayed at his post when his vessel was wrecked by an explosion.

See also
 Fireboats of New York City

References

1954 ships
Fireboats of New York City
Service vessels of the United States
Museum ships in New York (state)
Ships built by John H. Mathis & Company
Proposed museum ships in the United States